Klaus Wolfermann (born 31 March 1946) is a former West German javelin thrower. He won a gold medal at the 1972 Summer Olympics in Munich and set a world record in 1973.

The javelin competition at the 1972 Games was the closest in Olympic history. Wolfermann had taken the lead from Jānis Lūsis of the USSR in the fifth round with an Olympic Record throw of 90.48 meters. Then, in the sixth and final round, Lūsis let fly with a very long effort that measured at 90.46 meters – Wolfermann's two centimeter margin was, at the time, the smallest unit of measurement used in javelin competitions.

On 5 May 1973, Klaus Wolfermann set a new world record in the javelin throw, bettering Lūsis' previous record of 93.80 meters with a mark of 94.08 m. Wolfermann's record stood until 26 July 1976, when Hungary's Miklós Németh threw his javelin for 94.58 m at the 1976 Summer Olympics in Montreal, Quebec, Canada.

References

External links

 Interview

1946 births
Living people
West German male javelin throwers
Athletes (track and field) at the 1968 Summer Olympics
Athletes (track and field) at the 1972 Summer Olympics
Olympic athletes of West Germany
Olympic gold medalists for West Germany
Medalists at the 1972 Summer Olympics
Olympic gold medalists in athletics (track and field)
People from Altdorf bei Nürnberg
Sportspeople from Middle Franconia